Ichneutica omoplaca is a moth of the family Noctuidae. It is endemic to New Zealand. It is widespread from the Bay of Plenty in the North Island down to Southland in the South Island. Specimens have also been collected from the Auckland Islands. It lives in a variety of habitats including beech forest clearings and tussock grasslands. This species has been recorded that some of the larval hosts of this species include Poa cita, Dactylis glomerata and it has been reared on Plantago lanceolata. The larva is undescribed but pupae have been found in a pine plantation in soil under weeds.  Adults of this species are on the wing from October to March. The adult moths are variable in appearance but the diagnostic feature is the pale ochreous to white colouring between the basal streak and the costa which contrasts with the ground colour of the forewing.

Taxonomy 
This species was described by Edward Meyrick in 1887 using a specimen collected near Lake Coleridge and Rakaia and named Mamestra omoplaca. The female lectotype, collected at Rakaia, is held at the Natural History Museum, London. In 1988 J. S. Dugdale placed this species within the Graphania genus. In 2019 Robert Hoare undertook a major review of New Zealand Noctuidae. During this review the genus Ichneutica was greatly expanded and the genus Graphania was subsumed into that genus as a synonym. As a result of this review, this species is now known as Ichneutica omoplaca.

Description 

Meyrick described this species as follows:
The wingspan of the adult male of this species is between 31 and 41 mm and for the female is between 33 and 43 mm. This species is variable but the diagnostic feature is the pale ochreous to white colouring between the basal streak and the costa as it is more apparent as a result of the darker ground colour of the forewing. Where there is less of a contrast this species is possibly confused with. I. lindsayorum. I. lindsayorum normally has a much lighter thorax as well as a broader forewing with more arched costa.

Distribution 
It is endemic to New Zealand. This species is widespread from the Bay of Plenty in the North Island down to Southland in the South Island. Specimens have also been collected from the Auckland Islands. It has not been found in the northern part of the North Island.

Habitat 
This species lives in a variety of habitats including beech forest clearings and tussock grasslands.

Behaviour 
Adults of this species are on the wing from October to March. They almost always emerge earlier in the season than I. lindsayorum. The adults of this species are known to pollinate Leptospermum scoparium.

Life history and host species 

Reports on the life history of this species are lacking but it has been recorded that some of the larval hosts of this species include Poa cita, Dactylis glomerata and it has been reared on Plantago lanceolata. The larva is undescribed but pupae have been found in a pine plantation in soil under weeds.

References

Moths described in 1887
Hadeninae
Moths of New Zealand
Endemic fauna of New Zealand
Taxa named by Edward Meyrick
Endemic moths of New Zealand